Carel Anthonie van Wankum (22 April 1896 – 20 October 1961) was a Dutch rower. Together with Hein van Suylekom he won three bronze medals at the European championships of 1925–1927. The pair competed at the 1928 Summer Olympics, but failed to reach the final.

References

1896 births
1961 deaths
Dutch male rowers
Olympic rowers of the Netherlands
Rowers at the 1928 Summer Olympics
Rowers from Amsterdam
European Rowing Championships medalists
20th-century Dutch people